Mount Susong Dalaga or Bundok Susong Dalaga means "Maiden's Breasts Mountain" in Filipino and may refer to several summits in the Philippines, including:

Mount Susong Dalaga, Abra de Ilog, Occidental Mindoro
Mount Susong Dalaga, also known as Breast Peak, in Tampakan, South Cotabato
Susong Dalaga Peak of Mount Batolusong, Tanay, Rizal
Manabu Peak, also known as Mount Dalaga or Mount Susong Dalaga, of the Malepunyo Mountain Range in between the provinces of Batangas, Laguna, and Quezon
 Mount Malasimbo, also known as Mount Susong Dalaga, of the Zambales Mountain Range in Bataan
Mount Tagapo, also known as Susong Dalaga Mountain, in Talim Island, Rizal

See also
Breast-shaped hill